Vangelis Kerthi (born 26 July 1999) is an Albanian-born Greek professional footballer who plays as a defensive midfielder for Super League 2 club Almopos Aridea.

References

1999 births
Living people
Greek people of Albanian descent
Greek footballers
Super League Greece 2 players
Football League (Greece) players
Gamma Ethniki players
Kavala F.C. players
Almopos Aridea F.C. players
Association football midfielders